Eugene Maurice of Savoy-Carignano (French: Eugène Maurice de Savoie-Carignan; 2 March 1635 – 6 June 1673)  was a Franco-Italian nobleman and general. A count of Soissons, he was the father of Imperial field marshal Prince Eugene of Savoy.

Biography 
Eugene Maurice was born in Chambéry, Savoy. He was son of Thomas Francis, Prince of Carignano and Marie de Bourbon, Countess of Soissons. He was grandson of Charles Emmanuel I, Duke of Savoy and Catherine Micaela of Austria. 

On 21 February 1657 he married the "beautiful and witty" Olimpia Mancini, a niece of cardinal Mazarin, daughter of Michele Mancini and Geronima Mazarini.

He obtained high military posts through his wife's influence. He played a role in defeating the Spaniards at the battle of the Dunes in 1658. He took part in the campaigns at Flanders (1667), Franche-Comté (1668) and Holland (1672); and was present as ambassador extraordinary of France at the coronation of Charles II of England.

He died at Unna in Westphalia in 1673, out of a deadly fever, although there were voices that he had been poisoned.

Family 
Louis Thomas, Count of Soissons (1657–1702) married Uranie de La Cropte and had issue.
 Philippe, "Abbot of Soissons" (1659–1693) unmarried.
Louis Jules, Cavaliere of Savoy (1660–1683) killed at the battle of Petronell against the Turks known as the Cavaliere di Savoia.
 Emanuel Philibert, Count of Dreux (1662–1676) unmarried.
 Prince Eugene of Savoy (1663–1736), famous general.
 Princess Marie Jeanne of Savoy (1665-1705) Mademoiselle de Soissons.
 Princess Louise Philiberte of Savoy (1667–1726) Mademoiselle de Dreux.
 Princess Françoise of Savoy (1668–1671).

Ancestors

notes

References

Attribution:

1635 births
1673 deaths
Military personnel from Chambéry
Counts of Soissons
Counts of Dreux
Princes of Savoy
17th-century people from Savoy
Dukes of Carignan